Lars Thalian Backer (5 January 1892 – 7 June 1930) was a Norwegian architect. Backer was a pioneer of modernism in Norwegian architecture during the 1920s.

Biography
Backer was born in Oslo, Norway.  His  parents were Herman Major Backer (1856–1932) and Elisabeth Christiane Boeck (1868–1958). His father was also a noted architect whose work included  St. John's Church in Bergen and  Villa Fridheim in Krødsherad. 

Backer was educated at the Oslo National Academy of the Arts under the supervision of Herman Major Schirmer and the Royal Institute of Technology in Stockholm, from which he graduated in 1915.  He served as an apprentice with several notable contemporary architects in Norway, including Harald Hals (1876-1959) and Ole Sverre (1865-1952) as well as  Arnstein Arneberg  and Magnus Poulsson.

He attended the Architectural Association School of Architecture in London from 1919 to 1920. After completing an internship, he started his own practice in Oslo during 1921. 

Backer was responsible for several notable Scandinavian works including the Skansen restaurant (1926-1927) and Ekebergrestauranten  
(1927-29) in Oslo, and the first high-rise office building in the city. His Skansen restaurant was the first modernist building in Norway, earning Backer lasting fame as a pioneer of Scandinavian Functionalism.

Backer died at the age of 38 from a streptococcal infection. He was buried at  Vestre gravlund in Oslo.
Several members of his firm carried on his work and made names of their own, including Frithjof Stoud Platou who completed the design work on 
Horngården, an eight-story building on Egertorget in Oslo.

Buildings

References

1892 births
1930 deaths
Architects from Oslo
Modernist architects from Norway
KTH Royal Institute of Technology alumni
Alumni of the Architectural Association School of Architecture
Burials at Vestre gravlund